Following a string of defeats during Black Week in early December 1899, the British government realised that it would need more troops than just the Regular army to fight the Second Boer War, particularly mounted troops. On 13 December, the War Office decided to allow volunteer forces to serve in the field, and a Royal Warrant was issued on 24 December that officially created the Imperial Yeomanry (IY). This was organised as service companies of 121 officers and men enlisted for one year. Existing Yeomanry and fresh volunteers quickly filled the new force, which was equipped to operate as Mounted infantry. The companies were organised into battalions, often of companies from the same region. Besides the companies raised directly by the Yeomanry Cavalry regiments, a number of companies and battalions were formed by enthusiasts. These included Paget's Horse, the Sharpshooters and the Roughriders, all recruited in London, and the specialists of Lovat's Scouts. On arrival in South Africa, the companies were frequently used piecemeal in various ad hoc columns, and some of the battalions (for example 12th Battalion) never operated as formed units. At the end of their year of service, recruitment of a Second Contingent was authorised in January to replace the time-expired men in the original units and to form new units. A Third Contingent was recruited from late 1901 onwards, largely as new units, while the existing battalions were consolidated.

The following units of Imperial Yeomanry were formed between 1990 and 1902:

The mounted infantry experiment was considered a success and the existing Yeomanry regiments at home were reorganised and renamed as Imperial Yeomanry in 1901. Fresh regiments were also raised, often on the basis of returned veterans, such as the City of London Yeomanry (Rough Riders) and the 3rd County of London Yeomanry (Sharpshooters), the North Irish and South Irish Horse, and the Lovat Scouts.

Notes

References
 Col John K. Dunlop, The Development of the British Army 1899–1914, London: Methuen, 1938.
 J.B.M. Frederick, Lineage Book of British Land Forces 1660–1978, Vol I, Wakefield: Microform Academic, 1984, ISBN 1-85117-007-3.
 Maj R. Money Barnes, The Soldiers of London, London: Seeley Service, 1963.
 Lt-Col C.C.R. Murphy, The History of the Suffolk Regiment 1914–1927, London: Hutchinson, 1928/Uckfield: Naval & Military, 2002, ISBN 978-1-84342-245-7.
 Col H.C.B. Rogers, The Mounted Troops of the British Army 1066–1945, London: Seeley Service, 1959.
 Tpr Cosmo Rose-Innes, With Paget's Horse to the Front, London: John McQueen, 1901/Leopold Classic Library, 2015, ASIN: B019SZWY6K.
 Lt-Col Ernest Ryan, 'Arms, Uniforms and Equipment of the Yeomanry Cavalry', Journal of the Society for Army Historical Research, September 1957, Vol 35, pp. 124–33.
 Lt-Col J.D. Sainsbury, The Hertfordshire Yeomanry: An Illustrated History 1794–1920, Welwyn: Hertfordshire Yeomanry and Artillery Historical Trust/Hart Books, 1994, ISBN 0-948527-03-X.
 Edward M. Spiers, The Army and Society 1815–1914, London: Longmans, 1980, ISBN 0-582-48565-7.

External sources
 Anglo-Boer War
 T.F. Mills, Land Forces of Britain, the Empire and Commonwealth – Regiments.org (archive site)
 Roll of Honour

 
Imperial
Imperial